Wolcott Square Historic District is a national historic district located at the Village of Wolcott in Wayne County, New York.  The district includes the First Baptist Church, First Presbyterian Church, the Village Hall, the  village green (Northrup Park), a bandstand, and a public fountain.  The focal point is Northrup Park, laid out in 1813 for use by the local school district.

It was listed on the National Register of Historic Places in 2001.

On May 19, 2013, the First Presbyterian Church of Wolcott is celebrating its bicentennial with an organ recital concert.  The event also recognizes the 11th anniversary of the church's Petty-Madden organ.

Gallery

See also
National Register of Historic Places listings in Wayne County, New York

References

External links

Historic districts on the National Register of Historic Places in New York (state)
Neoclassical architecture in New York (state)
Historic districts in Wayne County, New York
National Register of Historic Places in Wayne County, New York